The Peetz Table Wind Complex is a 430.2 megawatt (MW) wind facility in Logan County west of the town of Peetz in northeastern Colorado.    The first 29.7 MW phase of construction called Peetz Table Wind, also known as Ridge Crest Wind, became the largest wind farm in the state upon its completion in 2001.    A second 400.5 MW construction phase, including the 201 MW Logan Wind Energy Center and the 199.5 MW Peetz Table Wind Energy Center, reclaimed the distinction upon its completion in 2007.

Facility details 

The Peetz Table is a plateau which provides access along its southern edge in Colorado to some of the best wind resources on the High Plains,  according to data from the United States Department of Energy.

The first phase was developed by the European firm EDF Energy in 2001.  It occupies farmland about two miles southwest of the small town of Peetz.  It consists of 33 NEG Micon NM52/900 wind turbines that are each rated at 0.9 MW.   At a total capacity of 29.7 MW, it was the largest wind farm in the state, surpassing the 25.3 MW Ponnequin Wind Farm which had been previously built up starting in the late 1990s.

NextEra Energy Resources developed and constructed the second phase in 2007 as one of the largest wind projects in the United States.  The twin 200 MW units occupy the remainder of the plateau to the west of Peetz and south of the Nebraska border.   It consists of 267 GE Energy 1.5SLE turbines rated at 1.5 MW.

In 2007, it was projected that the facility would have approximately 20 full-time employees when completed.

Electricity production 

(*) partial year of operation

See also

Wind power in the United States
Wind power in Colorado
List of onshore wind farms

References

External links
the-birds-and-the-peetz-wind-farm

Energy infrastructure completed in 2001
Energy infrastructure completed in 2007
Wind farms in Colorado
Buildings and structures in Logan County, Colorado
NextEra Energy